The Bornean whistling thrush (Myophonus borneensis) is a species of bird in the family Muscicapidae. It is found in Indonesia and Malaysia, where it is endemic to the island of Borneo. Its natural habitat is subtropical or tropical moist montane forests.

References

Myophonus
Birds described in 1885
Taxa named by Philip Sclater
Endemic birds of Borneo
Taxonomy articles created by Polbot